The tenth season of the Bleach anime series, released on DVD as the , is directed by Noriyuki Abe, and produced by TV Tokyo, Dentsu and Studio Pierrot. The season adapts Tite Kubo's Bleach manga series from the rest of the 32nd volume to the 35th volume (chapters 286–315), with the exception of episodes 204 and 205 (filler). The episodes' plot continues to follow Ichigo Kurosaki's and his friends' battle against the Espada, the strongest of former Soul Reaper Captain Sōsuke Aizen's army, to rescue Orihime Inoue. Episodes 204 and 205 are centered on a soccer match developed by the Kasumiōji Soul Reapers who appeared in season 9.

The season aired from October 2008 to February 2009 on TV Tokyo. The English adaptation of the anime is licensed by Viz Media, and aired on Cartoon Network's Adult Swim from February 6 to May 22, 2011. Aniplex released the season in a series of DVD compilations, with each of the four volumes containing four episodes. The first DVD volume was released on May 27, 2009, and the fourth one on August 26 of the same year.

The episodes use three pieces of theme music: one opening theme and two closing themes. The opening theme is "Velonica" by Aqua Timez. The first ending theme, "Hitohira no Hanabira" by Stereopony, is used for episode 190 to 201, and the second ending theme,  by Shion Tsuji, is used for the remainder. To promote the third feature film, Bleach: Fade to Black, which was released on December 13, 2008, the credits from episodes 197 through 201 use teaser footage.


Episode list

References
General

Specific

2008 Japanese television seasons
2009 Japanese television seasons
Season 10